Sainsbury's Bank plc, trading as Sainsbury's Bank, is a British bank wholly owned by Sainsbury's, a national supermarket chain in the United Kingdom. The bank began trading on 19 February 1997 as a joint venture between J Sainsbury plc and Bank of Scotland. Sainsbury's took full ownership of the bank in January 2014.

The bank's head office is located in Edinburgh, Scotland and its registered office in London, England. In 2017 it had over 2.1 million active customers.

History
Sainsbury's and Bank of Scotland (later a subsidiary of Lloyds Banking Group) formed the bank as a joint venture, and it received a full banking licence from the Bank of England in January 1997. It launched on 19 February 1997.

On 8 May 2013, Sainsbury's announced it would buy the 50% share in the business owned by Lloyds Banking Group. The transfer was completed on 31 January 2014, and Sainsbury's Bank became a wholly owned subsidiary of J Sainsbury plc.

Services
The bank provides a range of financial products including travel money, insurance, credit cards, savings and loans, having withdrawn from the mortgage market in 2019. It is authorised by the Prudential Regulation Authority and regulated by both the Financial Conduct Authority and the Prudential Regulation Authority. Sainsbury's Bank products are linked to the Nectar reward scheme and can be applied for online or by telephone.

Finances
In the 2019-20 financial year, the bank had an income of £323 million, customer deposits of £6.3 billion, and total assets of £9.4 billion.

References

External links

Banks of Scotland
Banks of the United Kingdom
Supermarket banks
Banks established in 1997
Sainsbury's
Companies based in Edinburgh